Fletcher is a surname of French, English, Scottish, and Irish origin. The name is a regional (La Flèche) and an occupational name for an arrowsmith (a maker and or seller of arrows), derived from the Old French flecher (in turn from Old French fleche "arrow"). The English word was borrowed into the Goidelic languages, leading to the development of the Scottish name "Mac an Fhleisteir" (also spelt "Mac an Fhleisdeir"), "the arrowsmith's son".

Fletcher was not necessarily the surname of a Fletcher/Arrowsmith, for example, John Little the Blacksmith, "Smith" not been his actual surname. The earliest record of the name is Jean de la Flèche (c.1030 – c.1097), a Norman noble from La Flèche, where he became its first Seigneur (lord) and held its original castle (the current one, on the same site is from the 15th century). He was father of Elias I, Count of Maine and a great grandfather of King Henry II. Jean de la Flèche was given land in England for services by William the Conqueror and some of his decedents and family settled in Yorkshire, England following the Norman Conquest. There is a record of a Robert le Flecher in 1203 (in the "Assize Court Rolls of Staffordshire", during the reign of King John), William Flecher’ also in 1203, and Peter le flechier in 1227. The name is often confused with Flesher, due to the phonetic similarity.

People
Aaron Fletcher (born 1996), American baseball player
Adam Fletcher (disambiguation), multiple people
Alan Fletcher (graphic designer) (1931–2006), British graphic designer
Alan Fletcher (actor) (born 1957), Australian actor 
Andrew Almon Fletcher, known as "Almon Fletcher" (1889–1964), Canadian physician and diabetologist
Andrew Fletcher (politician) (1653–1716), politician and Scottish Patriot
Andrew Fletcher (musician) (1961–2022), member of the English electronic music group Depeche Mode                                                              
Andre Fletcher (born 1987) Grenadian and West Indies cricket player
Art Fletcher (1885–1950), American baseball player
Arthur Fletcher (1924–2005), American government official
Arthur Fletcher (rugby league), English rugby league player
Ashley Michael Fletcher (born 1995) English professional footballer
Banister Fletcher (Senior) (1833–1899), English architect and historian, also Member of Parliament, father of
Sir Banister Fletcher (1866–1953), English architect and historian
Barry Fletcher (born 1935), English cricketer
Betty Fletcher (1923–2012), U.S. federal judge
Blandford Fletcher (1858–1936), British painter
Bob Fletcher (1911–2013) California farmer who helped Japanese neighbors during WWII
Bryan Fletcher (disambiguation), multiple people
Cari Fletcher (born 1994), American actress, singer, and songwriter
Carl Fletcher (Canadian soccer), footballer born 1971
Carl Fletcher (Welsh footballer), footballer born 1980
Carrie Hope Fletcher, Westend actress, singer, author, blogger, vlogger
Charles Fletcher, multiple people
Chris Fletcher (born 1948), American football player (San Diego Chargers)
Christian Fletcher ( 1619–1691), Scottish minister's wife who helped save the Honours of Scotland
Christopher Fletcher (born 1957), English cricket player (Sussex)
Christopher D. M. Fletcher (born 1958), British pathologist
Christy Fletcher (born 1933), Irish football (soccer) player
Colin Fletcher (1922–2007), Welsh-American backpacker and author
C.T. Fletcher (born 1959), American ex.powerlifter, actor, video-blogger 
Cyril Fletcher (1913–2005), English comedian, actor and businessman
Darren Fletcher (born 1984), Scottish footballer
Darrin Fletcher (born 1966), American baseball player
David Fletcher (disambiguation), multiple people 
Duncan Fletcher (born 1948), Zimbabwean cricketer and coach of the England and India cricket teams
Dustin Fletcher (born 1975), Australian football player
Edward Fletcher (disambiguation), multiple people
Elias I, Count of Maine (died 11 July 1110), Count of Maine and great grandfather of Henry II of England
Eric Fletcher (1903–1990), English politician and peer
Ernie Fletcher (born 1952), governor of Kentucky
Fletcher Christian was master's mate on board HMS Bounty during Lieutenant William Bligh's voyage to Tahiti during 1787–1789
Frank Friday Fletcher (1855–1928), admiral in the United States Navy
Frank Jack Fletcher (1885–1973), admiral in the United States Navy
Freddie Fletcher (born 1950), English Actor
George Fletcher (disambiguation), multiple people
Giles Fletcher, the Elder (c. 1548–1611), English poet and diplomat 
Giles Fletcher (c. 1586–1623), English playwright
Guy Fletcher (born 1960), English keyboard player from the band Dire Straits
Guy Fletcher (songwriter), English songwriter and session singer
Harvey Fletcher (1884–1981), American physicist and inventor
Henry Fletcher (disambiguation), multiple people
Horace Fletcher (1849–1919), American health-food faddist of the Victorian era
Isaac Fletcher (1784–1842), American lawyer and politician
Isaac Fletcher (English politician) (1827–1879) English MP
J.S. Fletcher (1863–1935), English novelist and poet
James C. Fletcher (1919–1991), Former NASA administrator 
Jan Fletcher, British entrepreneur
Jane Fletcher (1870–1956), Tasmanian author and poet
Jane Fletcher (writer) (born 1956), English author of lesbian fiction 
Jason Fletcher (1975), American Sports Agent 
Jean de la Flèche (c.1030 – c.1097), 11th-century French nobleman
Joan Bamford Fletcher (1909–1979), Canadian member of the First Aid Nursing Yeomanry
John Fletcher (disambiguation), multiple people
Joseph Fletcher (1905–1991), professor
Justin Fletcher (born 1970), English children's TV personality 
Keith Fletcher (born 1944), English cricketer
Kelvin Fletcher (born 1984), Emmerdale Actor and Strictly Come Dancing 2019
Kimberly Fletcher, founder of Moms for America
Kirk Fletcher (born 1975), American blues guitarist, singer, and songwriter
Lawrence Fletcher (died 1608), Jacobean actor
Lisa Anne Fletcher (1844–1905), American poet and correspondent
Lloyd Fletcher (1915–1991), United States Court of Federal Claims judge
Louise Fletcher (1934–2022), American actress
Lucy Nettie Fletcher (1886-1918), nurse
Mark Fletcher (disambiguation), several people
Michael Fletcher (born 1977), professional Canadian football linebacker
Michael Scott Fletcher (1868–1947), Australian Methodist minister
Moses Fletcher, (c. 1564–1620) Mayflower pilgrim
Najuma Fletcher (born 1974), Guyanese track and field athlete
Neil Fletcher (politician), (born 1944), British politician
Norman Fletcher (disambiguation), multiple people
Percy Fletcher (1879–1932), British composer
Peter Fletcher (disambiguation), multiple people
Phil Fletcher (born 1975/6), British puppeteer
Phineas Fletcher (1582–1650), English playwright
Ray Fletcher (1921–1991), British politician
Richard Fletcher (disambiguation), multiple people
Rod Fletcher (born 1945), English footballer
Rod Fletcher (basketball), American college basketball player
Rosamund Fletcher (1908–1993), British sculptor
Sally Fletcher-Murchison (born 1933), American/Hawaiian ceramicist
Samuel Fletcher (died 1950), Canadian politician 
Sherry Fletcher (born 1986), Grenadian track and field sprinter
Simon Fletcher, multiple people
Steven Fletcher (footballer) (born 1987), Scottish international footballer 
Tait Fletcher, American former professional MMA fighter
Thomas Fletcher (disambiguation), multiple people
William Fletcher (disambiguation), multiple people
William Bartlett Fletcher, Sr. (1862–1957), Rear Admiral in the United States Navy
William Roby Fletcher South Australian Congregationalist minister and University administrator
Yvonne Fletcher (1959–1984), police officer killed by a gunshot from the Libyan Embassy in London

Fictional characters
 Irwin Maurice "Fletch" Fletcher, the main character in the novel Fletch and subsequent novels by Gregory McDonald
 Jamie "Fletch" Fletcher, in the British soap opera Hollyoaks
 Jerry Fletcher, the protagonist of Conspiracy Theory (film), portrayed by Mel Gibson
 Fletch, one of the thugs working for the villain "Ellis DeWald" in the movie Beverly Hills Cop III, portrayed by Michael Bowen
 Fletcher, one of the names of the main antagonist in the Tamil movie Dasavathaaram
 Jessica Fletcher, the main character of the television series Murder, She Wrote
 Karl Fletcher, a central character of the British television series Dream Team
 Michael Fletcher, character in Mach Breakers: Numan Athletics 2 sports arcade game
 Morris Fletcher, a recurring character in The X-Files and The Lone Gunmen
 Mundungus Fletcher, a Harry Potter character
 Norman Stanley Fletcher, the lead character in the British sitcom Porridge
 SJ Fletcher and Sid Fletcher from the British soap opera EastEnders
 Will Fletcher, a character in the ITV television drama series The Bill
 Ferb, Lil Fletcher, D-Fletcher, and Lawrence Fletcher, from the Disney Channel series Phineas and Ferb
 The Fletcher family in the movie Raise Your Voice
 Brigadier General Fletcher, a character in the video game Supreme Commander: Forged Alliance
 James Emerson (Jaimy) Fletcher, a major supporting character in L. A. Meyer's Bloody Jack series
 Fletcher Reede, the protagonist of the movie Liar Liar
 Terence Fletcher, in the 2014 movie Whiplash

See also
Arrowsmith (surname)
Fletcher (disambiguation)
Justice Fletcher (disambiguation)
Fletching

References

English-language surnames
Occupational surnames
English-language occupational surnames